Kettlethorpe, originally a separate village, is a suburb that lies  south of Wakefield city centre, in West Yorkshire, England. The suburb has a secondary education school, Kettlethorpe High School, which is a specialist maths and computing college. It was deemed to be good by Ofsted in 2011 and again in 2016.

Kettlethorpe Hall was built in 1727 by the Pilkington family.  It has been converted into two separate houses.

References

External links

Suburbs of Wakefield